Robert Chandler Patterson (born May 16, 1959) is an American former professional baseball player. He played all or part of 13 seasons in Major League Baseball (MLB) between 1985 and 1998, primarily as a middle-relief pitcher. He played for the San Diego Padres (1985), Pittsburgh Pirates (1986–92), Texas Rangers (1993), California Angels (1994–95) and Chicago Cubs (1996–98). He batted right-handed and threw left-handed.

In his career, Patterson posted a 39–40 record with a 4.08 ERA and 28 saves in 559 appearances, including a 2.68 strikeout-to-walk ratio (483-to-180), 175 games finished, and  innings.

He was a good fielding pitcher in his major league career. He committed only one error in 98 total chances for a .990 fielding percentage.

During his career, Patterson was known as the Glove Doctor: many players, even from opposing teams, would ask Patterson to repair their broken gloves. Patterson would spend his time in the bullpen during games repairing and relacing gloves, sometimes incorporating coat hangers, tongue depressors, and extra leather.

External links

1959 births
Living people
American expatriate baseball players in Canada
Baseball players from Florida
Beaumont Golden Gators players
Buffalo Bisons (minor league) players
California Angels players
Chicago Cubs players
Gulf Coast Padres players
Hawaii Islanders players
Las Vegas Stars (baseball) players
Major League Baseball pitchers
Pittsburgh Pirates players
Reno Padres players
San Diego Padres players
Texas Rangers players
Vancouver Canadians players